Hot Tamale may refer to:
Hot Tamales, a brand of cinnamon candy
Hot Tamale, a 2006 American film
Hot tamale, a type of tamale originating in the Mississippi Delta area that is spicy and is made from corn meal instead of masa
Hot tamale, a term for a sloppy joe in use in the Sheboygan, Wisconsin area

See also
Tamale
Hot Tamale Baby, a 1985 blues album by Macia Ball
"Hot Tamale Alley", an 1896 song written by May Irwin
Hot Tamale Brass Band
"Hot tamale train", a recurring phrase on So You Think You Can Dance
Here Comes the Hot Tamale Man, an album by The New Leviathan Oriental Fox-Trot Orchestra